Delroy Fraser is a Guyanese professional footballer who plays as a forward for GFF Elite League club Guyana Defence Force and the Guyana national team.

Personal life 
Delroy's brother Delwin is also a footballer. They have played together for Guyana Defence Force and for the Guyana national team.

References

External links 
 

Year of birth uncertain
Living people
Sportspeople from Georgetown, Guyana
Guyanese footballers
Association football forwards
Guyana international footballers
Guyana Defence Force FC players
Year of birth missing (living people)